Michael Bemben (born 28 January 1976) is a German former professional footballer who played as a right-back.

Career
In summer 2010, Bemben joined Górnik Zabrze on a one-year deal.

Personal life
In January 2015, Bemben joined lower-league club FC Frohlinde. Born in Poland, he has German citizenship.

Career statistics

References

External links
 
 
 Michael Bemben at immerunioner.de 

Living people
1976 births
Polish emigrants to Germany
Naturalized citizens of Germany
German people of Polish descent
Sportspeople from Ruda Śląska
Polish footballers
German footballers
Association football fullbacks
Bundesliga players
2. Bundesliga players
3. Liga players
Regionalliga players
Ekstraklasa players
Hammer SpVg players
VfL Bochum players
VfL Bochum II players
Rot-Weiss Essen players
1. FC Union Berlin players
Wuppertaler SV players
Górnik Zabrze players